D'Nash (often stylized as D'NASH, originally Nash) was a Spanish vocal group, best known for representing Spain in the 2007 Eurovision Song Contest.

Members
 Basty - real name: Esteban Piñero Camacho - born 28 February 1981, Cádiz
 Mikel - real name: Michael Hennet Sotomayor - born 20 January 1983, Puerto de la Cruz
 Javi - real name: Francisco Javier Álvarez Colinet - born 30 April 1983, Seville
 Ony - real name: Antonio Martos Ortiz - born 19 February 1981, Valencia

Biography
In February 2006, the band released its first single "Capaz de todo" (English: "Capable of Everything"). The album Capaz de todo was released a month later on March 28. In June 2006, they released a second single, "¿Dónde estás?" ("Where Are You?"), a ballad. Their album was reissued in November with two extra songs, "¿Qué sabes del amor?" ("What Do You Know About Love?") and "Más allá de las estrellas" ("Beyond The Stars"), a Christmas song. The latter became a single promoting the Special Edition.

On February 24, 2007, Nash won Misión Eurovisión 2007, a Spanish TV program searching for the next representative of Spain in the 2007 Eurovision Song Contest, which was held on May 12 in Helsinki. Just before entering the competition, they announced a change of name from Nash to D'Nash, due to the existence of a power pop band named The Nash from Majorca. They entered the competition with the song "I Love You Mi Vida" (literally "I Love You My Darling" but in this case 'my darling' refers to the love interest, making it 'sweetheart'), which ended the night in 20th position (out of 24 competitors) with a total of 43 points.

In April 2007, they re-released their album, with the Eurovision-entry song "I Love You Mi Vida" and the other finalist songs from the preselection ("Una lágrima", "Tu voz se apagará", "La reina de la noche" and "Busco una chica"). Also, a cover of Ben E. King's hit Stand by Me was included on the album and was later released as a promotional single. The album reached number 23 in Spain, selling a total of 30,000 copies.

In November 2007, the band released a new single, "Amanda", which preceded the new album Todo va a cambiar (English: Everything's Going to Change), released on 4 December 2007.This album sold 35.000 copies in Spain.

On July 22, 2008, it was announced that Ony would leave the group after their summer tour ended in September, to pursue a career in musical theatre. Their last performance as a four-piece took place in Fuengirola, Málaga.

The band's three remaining members continued after his departure. The band split up  in 2013 due to low sales of their last album Garabatos and Javi started a solo career .

The four original members reunited for a one-off concert in Madrid on 21 December 2014, without ruling out other future projects for the band. In 2016, the band were guest performers at Objetivo Eurovisión, the Spanish national final for the Eurovision Song Contest 2016.

Discography

Albums

Singles

References

External links
Official website
Official fanclub
Official Caes website (label)

Spanish boy bands
Spanish pop music groups
Eurovision Song Contest entrants for Spain
Eurovision Song Contest entrants of 2007